Atlantic Bridge was the Irish uilleann pipes player  Davy Spillane's first solo album after the break-up of Moving Hearts.  Together with producer P.J. Curtis he assembled a stellar cast of musicians from both sides of the Atlantic including, Albert Lee, Béla Fleck, Jerry Douglas, Christy Moore and many more to produce a fine blend of traditional and contemporary music. Curtis observed the album's fusion of Irish traditional, contemporary, bluegrass and country rock, merging "happily to find new dimensions in music which resulted form those meetings."

The album was originally released on Tara Music in 1987. AllMusic awards the album with 4.5 stars.

There is a short acoustic hidden track at index point 11.

Track listing
 "Davy's Reels" (Davy Spillane) – 3:36
 "Atlantic Bridge" (Spillane) – 5:22
 "Daire's Dream" (Spillane) – 3:34
 "Tribute to Johnny Doran" (Trad.) – 3:06
 "O'Neills's Statement" (O'Neill) – 3:50
 "By the River of Gems" (Spillane) – 7:41
 "Sliverish" (Béla Fleck) – 2:58
 "The Pigeon on the Gate" (O'Neill, Spillane) – 2:43
 "In My Life" (John Lennon, Paul McCartney) – 2:45
 "Lansdowne Blues" (Boland, Donnelly, Lee, O'Neill, Spillane) – 5:49
 Untitled (unknown) – 0:12

Personnel
Davy Spillane – Uilleann pipes, Low Whistles, Hammer Dulcimer
Albert Lee – Electric and Acoustic Guitar, Piano
Béla Fleck – Banjo, Acoustic Guitar
Jerry Douglas – Dobro
Greg Boland – Guitars
Eoghan O'Neill – Bass, Acoustic Guitars, Backing Vocals
Christy Moore – Bodhrán
Noel Eccles – Percussion
John Donnelly – Drums

References

1987 debut albums
Davy Spillane albums